Richard Gordon Perdue (13 February 1910 – 8 August 1998) was an Anglican bishop.

Perdue was educated at Trinity College, Dublin, and ordained in 1934. After curacies at Drumcondra and Rathmines he was the incumbent at Castledermot and then Archdeacon of Killaloe and Kilfenora. He was ordained to the episcopate as the Bishop of Killaloe, Kilfenora, Clonfert and Kilmacduagh in 1953 and translated to be the Bishop of Cork, Cloyne and Ross in 1957. He retired in 1978.

References

1910 births
1998 deaths
Alumni of Trinity College Dublin
Archdeacons of Killaloe
Bishops of Killaloe and Clonfert
Bishops of Cork, Cloyne and Ross
20th-century Anglican bishops in Ireland